Axus or Axos, also Oaxus or Oaxos (Ὄαξος) and Waxus or Waxos (Ϝάξος), was a city and polis (city-state) of ancient Crete. According to Virgil, it was situated on a river; which, according to Vibius Sequester, gave its name to Axus. According to the Cyrenaean traditions, the Theraean Battus, their founder, was the son of a damsel named Phronimne, the daughter of Etearchus, king of this city. The town must be quite ancient as its name appears in Mycenaean Linear B tablets in the form e-ko-so. It was an inland town and its harbour was at Astale.

The site of Axus is located near modern Axos, near Mount Ida. In the 19th century, remains belonging to the so-called Cyclopean walls were found, and in the church a piece of white marble with a sepulchral inscription in the ancient Doric Greek language of the island. On another inscription was a decree of a "common assembly of the Cretans," an instance of the well known Syncretism, as it was called. The coins of Axus present types of Zeus and Apollo, as might be expected in a city situated on the slopes of Mt. Ida, and the foundation of which was, by one of the legends, ascribed to a son of Apollo. The situation answers to one of the etymologies of the name: it was called Axus because the place is precipitous, that word being used by the Cretans in the same sense that the other Greeks assigned to ἀγμός, a crag.

References

Populated places in ancient Crete
Former populated places in Greece
Cretan city-states
Locations in Greek mythology
Ancient Greek archaeological sites in Greece
Archaeological sites in Crete